Bear Pond is a lake in Hancock County, Maine, United States. The inflow to Bear Pond comes primarily from Bear Brook, which drains the southeastern slopes of Lead Mountain, which comprises primarily the Bear Brook Watershed in Maine (BBWM), an experimental forest. There are two USGS stream gauges on the East and West Branches of Bear Brook. Bear Pond is surrounded by forest and is drained at its western end by the Little Narraguagus River.

References

Lakes of Hancock County, Maine
Glacial lakes of the United States
Lakes of Maine